The 19 Geo 2 c 7, sometimes referred to as the Court of Session (Scotland) Act 1745, was an Act of the Parliament of Great Britain passed in 1745 and expressly repealed in 1867. It adjourned the Scottish Court of Session, which was unable to sit whilst Edinburgh was occupied by Jacobite forces.

The Act adjourned the court from 1 November 1745 to 1 June 1746. It further provided that the time period between 16 September 1745 (when Edinburgh was occupied) to 1 June 1746 was to be ignored for legal reckoning, and that any court proceedings active were to be continued in the same state on 1 June 1746 as they had been on 1 November 1745.

The Act was expressly repealed as expired by the Statute Law Revision Act 1867.

References
The statutes at large from the 15th to the 20th year of King George III [vol. XVIII]; Charles Bathurst, London. 1765.
Chronological table of the statutes; HMSO, London. 1993. 

Great Britain Acts of Parliament 1745
Court of Session
1745 in Scotland
Repealed Great Britain Acts of Parliament
Acts of the Parliament of Great Britain concerning Scotland
Jacobite rising of 1745